Prince Albert is a federal electoral district in Saskatchewan, Canada, that has been represented in the House of Commons of Canada from 1908 to 1988, and since 1997.

It is one of two districts which has been represented by two different Prime Ministers: William Lyon Mackenzie King from 1926 to 1945, and John Diefenbaker from 1953 to 1979; the district of Quebec East was the other. It is also the only district where two future Prime Ministers competed against each other – King against Diefenbaker, in the 1926 election.

Geography

This riding is found in the central part of the province, in the transitional area between the Aspen parkland and boreal forest biomes. The major centre of the riding, and its namesake, is the city of Prince Albert which has a rich political history. Smaller centres in the riding include Nipawin, Melfort, and Tisdale.

History
The electoral district was first created in 1907 from portions of Humboldt, Mackenzie, and Saskatchewan. It existed in this form until 1987 when it was abolished into Prince Albert—Churchill River, Saskatoon—Humboldt, and The Battlefords—Meadow Lake.  It was re-created in 1996 from portions of the Prince Albert—Churchill River, Mackenzie, and Saskatoon—Humboldt ridings.

While the city of Prince Albert has significant NDP support, the rural areas are among the most conservative in Saskatchewan and the country.  As a result, it has been in the hands of a centre-right party for its entire existence in its current incarnation.

This riding lost a fraction of territory to Desnethé—Missinippi—Churchill River, and gained territory from Saskatoon—Humboldt, Desnethé—Missinippi—Churchill River and a fraction from Saskatoon—Wanuskewin during the 2012 electoral redistribution.

During the campaign for the 2021 election, Liberal candidate, Estelle Hjertaas, had several of her campaign signs vandalized.

Members of Parliament

Election results

1997–present

1908–1988

See also

 List of Canadian federal electoral districts
 Past Canadian electoral districts

References

Notes

External links
 
 
 Expenditures – 2008
 Expenditures – 2004
 Expenditures – 2000
 Expenditures – 1997
 Website of the Parliament of Canada

Politics of Prince Albert, Saskatchewan
Saskatchewan federal electoral districts